Harleigh is a census-designated place (CDP) in Hazle Township, Luzerne County, Pennsylvania, United States, north of the city of Hazleton. The CDP population was 1,104 at the 2010 census.

Geography

Harleigh is located less than one mile north of the city of Hazleton, along PA 940 (an east-west road). The western terminus of PA 940 is located just west of Harleigh at PA 309 (a north-south highway); it connects Hazleton (to the south) with Mountain Top and Wilkes-Barre (to the north).

Demographics

References

Census-designated places in Luzerne County, Pennsylvania
Census-designated places in Pennsylvania